In the Dark Half is a 2011 British drama film directed by Alastair Siddons and starring Tony Curran, Lyndsey Marshal, and Jessica Barden.  Barden plays a teenaged girl who becomes obsessed with her neighbour, played by Curran, and his grief over losing his son.  It received mixed reviews.

Plot summary 
Marie, a 15-year-old girl, lives with Kathy, her mother, and occasionally babysits for her next door neighbour, Filthy, a poacher who is widely rumoured to have murdered his wife.  Marie and Kathy have been drifting apart, with unresolved issues between them.  Kathy's behaviour has been erratic and Marie believes that her mother plans to leave her.  When Filthy's young son, Sean, spontaneously dies of apparently natural causes while Marie is babysitting him, Marie becomes obsessed with her neighbour and begins to think that his stories about spirits in the hills may be true.

Filthy, devastated by the loss of his son, reacts furiously when Marie loots his traps and breaks into his house to steal Sean's favourite toy.  When Marie states that she needs these items in order to appease the spirits and contact his dead son, Filthy initially dismisses the myths as idle stories he told Sean.  However, Filthy eventually comes to believe Marie and commits suicide to be with his son, whom he believes to be lonely.  Before he dies, Filthy urges Marie to return to her own father, and Marie realises that she has repressed her mother's suicide; instead of living with her mother, she has been working through her grief and denial while ignoring her father.  Having come to terms with her loss, Marie reunites with her father.

Cast 
 Jessica Barden as Marie
 Alfie Hepper as Sean
 Tony Curran as Filthy
 Lyndsey Marshal as Kathy
 Georgia Henshaw as Michelle
 Simon Armstrong as Steve

Production 
In the Dark Half was shot in Bristol, South West England, England.  Producer Matheson was drawn to the script because of the quality and opportunity to work in a new genre, and director Siddons was inspired by European horror films.

Release 
In the Dark Half premiered at Raindance Film Festival on 8 October 2011.  The United Kingdom theatrical premiere was on 10 August 2012.

Reception 
Rotten Tomatoes, a review aggregator, reports that 67% of nine surveyed critics gave the film a positive review; while only 26% of the forty-six surveyed users gave the film a positive review. The average rating of the film is 5.5/10.  Catherine Shoard of The Guardian rated the film 3/5 stars and called it "polished and impressive", though she faulted it for requiring "slightly more patience than it consistently rewards". Philip French, also of The Guardian, wrote in a negative review that the film is "ambitious but disappointing".  Writing in Time Out London, Dave Calhoun rated the film 3/5 stars and described it as a "mysterious, thoughtful experiment". Kim Newman of Empire rated it 2/5 stars and criticised the film's pacing. Josh Winning of Total Film rated the film 3/5 stars and compared it to The Sixth Sense. Reviewing the film on DVD, Ben Walsh of The Independent called it "a promising debut from Siddons".

References

External links 
 
 

2012 films
British drama films
British supernatural thriller films
2010s psychological horror films
Films set in Bristol
Films shot in Bristol
Films about death
2012 drama films
2010s English-language films
2010s British films